Mukai may refer to:

 Mukai - King of Fighters character
 Mukai, an album by Louis Mhlanga

People with the surname
 Chiaki Mukai, Japanese physician and astronaut
 Chiaki Mukai (Go player), Japanese Go player
 Chie Mukai, Japanese composer and musician
 Hirofumi Mukai, Japanese boxer
 Kan Mukai, Japanese film director, cinematographer, producer and screenwriter
 Kuma Mukai, Japanese painter
 Masahiro Mukai, Japanese director
 Masao Mukai, Japanese choir conductor
 Natsumi Mukai, manga artist
 Osamu Mukai, Japanese actor
 Shigeharu Mukai, Japanese jazz trombonist
 Shigeru Mukai, Japanese mathematician
 Mukai Shōgen Tadakatsu (1582−1641), Japanese samurai and admiral
 Shogo Mukai, Japanese rugby coach
, Japanese judoka
 Taichi Mukai, Japanese singer, songwriter and model
 Yusuke Mukai, Japanese footballer. 

Japanese-language surnames